The 1941 All-Ireland Senior Camogie Championship Final was the tenth All-Ireland Final and the deciding match of the 1939 All-Ireland Senior Camogie Championship, an inter-county camogie tournament for the top teams in Ireland.

Cork led 4-5 to no score at half-time. Kathleen Buckley scored six goals.

References

All-Ireland Senior Camogie Championship Final
All-Ireland Senior Camogie Championship Final, 1941
All-Ireland Senior Camogie Championship Final
All-Ireland Senior Camogie Championship Finals
Cork county camogie team matches
Dublin county camogie team matches